Noureldin Hany Mohamed Gomaa Hassan (born 2 March 1998) is an Egyptian wrestler competing in both freestyle and Greco-Roman wrestling. He won a silver medal at the African Games, a bronze medal at the Mediterranean Games and several bronze medals at the African Wrestling Championships.

Career 

He represented Egypt at the 2019 African Games held in Rabat, Morocco and he won the silver medal in the men's 97 kg event.

In 2020, he won the bronze medal in the men's 97kg event at the African Wrestling Championships held in Algiers, Algeria.

He won one of the bronze medals in both the men's freestyle 92 kg event and the men's Greco-Roman 87 kg event at the 2022 African Wrestling Championships held in El Jadida, Morocco. He won one of the bronze medals in the men's 87 kg event at the 2022 Mediterranean Games held in Oran, Algeria.

Achievements

References

External links 
 

Living people
1998 births
Place of birth missing (living people)
Egyptian male sport wrestlers
African Games silver medalists for Egypt
African Games medalists in wrestling
Competitors at the 2019 African Games
African Wrestling Championships medalists
Competitors at the 2022 Mediterranean Games
Mediterranean Games bronze medalists for Egypt
Mediterranean Games medalists in wrestling
20th-century Egyptian people
21st-century Egyptian people